Who Dares Wins is an Australian adventure game show that aired on the Seven Network between 1996 and 1998, with repeats airing in 1999 to 2001, 2005 and 2007. Hosted by former Test cricketer Mike Whitney and co-hosted by Tania Zaetta, the show has been screened in over 50 countries around the world.

As an adventure game show in which contestants are expected to complete undesirable tasks to win prizes, Who Dares Wins could be considered a precursor to contemporary reality TV series such as Fear Factor. It was created by David Mason and Adrian Brant.

Format 
The main focus of each episode of the show often revolves around a dangerous stunt of some kind. An unsuspecting contestant, previously nominated by a viewer of the show, is ambushed by Whitney and dared to partake and complete the stunt successfully to win a major consolation prize (usually a holiday and spending money).

Most of the runtime of a typical episode is devoted to the preparation of the stunt and the training the contestant receives. Often the stunt would also be demonstrated beforehand (successfully or unsuccessfully) by professional stuntmen.

In the climax of the show the contestant then attempts to complete the dare; if successful, they win the major prize. If they fail or decide to drop out, co-host Zaetta will then try to complete the dare instead; the contestants forfeits the prize if she succeeds, but if she fails or pulls out herself, the contestant wins regardless.

During the show, each major dare is bookended by several minor segments in which Whitney travels the streets and shopping malls of Australia challenging people to complete a lesser dare for a cash prize (usually around A$50 to $200). This may range from sticking a hand into a container full of cockroaches or having all their hair shaved off, to more complex dares such as tightrope walking above a mall foyer, or diving off a ten-metre platform into a pool.

Despite Australian production of the show ending in 1998, Who Dares Wins continues to be popular around the globe on cable television networks such as AXN. In particular, the show's massive success in India even led to a series of India-based specials hosted by Whitney and Zaetta in 2002, and later an Indian spin-off called Extreme Dhamaka in 2003.

The show was also licensed to the United Kingdom and named Don't Try This at Home and then renamed Challenge of a Lifetime. In the United States the Game Show Network aired Who Dares Wins on several occasions, with the tagline that Who Dares Wins was "Australian for Game Show" as a parody of Foster's Lager's American advertising campaign of the time.

Maxibon challenge 
At the height of the show's popularity, Mike Whitney introduced the 'Maxibon challenge', a minor segment challenge to eat a Nestlé Maxibon ice-cream in 30 seconds. Every week Whitney would test the mettle of the Australian public. If a contestant managed to complete the challenge, they would then be awarded AU$50 and dubbed a 'Whitney Warrior'.

Licensed merchandise 
A board game called Who Dares Wins: The Board Game was made and released by Milton Bradley featuring the Seven Network logo and a picture of Mike Whitney on the cover of the box.

Series overview

Awards 

|-
! scope=row | 1997
| 39th Annual TV Week Logie Awards
| Most Popular New Talent
| Tania Zaetta
| 
|

See also 
 List of Australian television series

References

External links 
 
 

1990s Australian game shows
1990s Australian reality television series
Seven Network original programming
1996 Australian television series debuts
1998 Australian television series endings